The 2004 Hamilton Tiger-Cats season was the 47th season for the team in the Canadian Football League and their 55th overall. The Tiger-Cats finished in 3rd place in the East Division with a 9–8–1 record, which surprised many as they had gone 1–17 the year before. They played in the East Semi-Final against the Toronto Argonauts, but lost 24–6.

Offseason

CFL Draft

Preseason

Regular season

Season standings

Season schedule

Postseason

Awards and records

2004 CFL All-Stars
 Tim Cheatwood - Defensive End
 D.J. Flick - Wide Receiver
 Troy Davis - Running Back

Eastern Division All-Star Selections

References

Hamilton Tiger-Cats seasons
Hamilton